"Dreams for Sale" is the second segment of the second episode of the first season (1985–86) of the television series The Twilight Zone. A woman (Meg Foster) finds that a relaxing outdoor picnic with her family is nothing more than an escapist fantasy that is beamed directly into her brain.

Plot
On an idyllic outdoor picnic with her husband, their daughters, and their dog, a woman becomes confused and disoriented when her vision stutters and events begin repeating themselves. Her reality becomes so distorted with repeating images and sounds that she screams. Waking in a dream-making machine, she discovers she is in the future, alongside hundreds of others. They are all in a sterile, industrial indoor environment. A technician explains to her that she was in a Dreamatron, which is a "Fully Interactive Dream Machine," and it was running a "Country Picnic" program.

He fixes the circuit board for her dream bay and tells her to enjoy her last six minutes before returning to work. Still confused, she returns to her dream world. She tries to tell her husband about her "dream" but forgets it almost straight away. She asks her fantasy husband if she can stay with him there forever. He tells her she can and that he wants her to stay forever, too.

Meanwhile, the machine burns out before the technicians can disconnect her, trapping her in the alternate reality forever. They console themselves, "At least she died happy."

External links
 

1985 American television episodes
The Twilight Zone (1985 TV series season 1) episodes
Television episodes about virtual reality

fr:Rêve-machine